Alphinellus is a genus of beetles in the family Cerambycidae, containing the following species:

 Alphinellus carinipennis Bates, 1885
 Alphinellus gibbicollis Bates, 1881
 Alphinellus minimus Bates, 1881
 Alphinellus subcornutus Bates, 1881

References

Acanthocinini